Amy Nelson (born 1980) is an American lawyer, political activist, and entrepreneur. She grew up in Ohio where she became interested in politics at an early age. She earned degrees in International Studies from Emory University and Law from New York University. Nelson worked as a corporate attorney and served on Barack Obama's Finance Committee prior to becoming an entrepreneur. In January 2017, she founded The Riveter, an organization that provides work space and other services to support working women.

Early life and education 
Amy Nelson was born in 1980 and grew up in Ohio. Nelson developed an interest in politics in her youth, going door-to-door for political campaigns. Her first jobs were as a nanny, then as a waitress. Nelson earned a Bachelor's degree in International Studies from Emory University. While attending college, Nelson interned at the Carter Center, where she accepted a full-time job upon graduation. She then earned a J.D. in law from the NYU School of Law.

Career 
After graduating from NYU Law, Nelson worked in law and politics for about a decade. Initially, she did corporate litigation for Cahill Gordon & Reindel. While in New York, she also worked for then President Barack Obama's Finance Committee and co-founded Gen44, the under-40 fundraising arm of the Obama campaign. She also supported fund-raising campaigns for pro-choice politicians. Nelson moved to Seattle in 2012 after her boyfriend (current husband) got a job at Amazon.com. Subsequently, Nelson worked as an in-house corporate attorney for a tech company in Seattle.

In January 2017, Nelson left her job as an attorney to start fund-raising for The Riveter, where she was one of the founders. Nelson raised about $700,000 and opened The Riveter's first office that May in Seattle. The Riveter is named after Rosie the Riveter, who was a symbol for female factory workers during World War II. It provides work space, conducts political advocacy, hosts events, and provides other resources for working women. The Riveter has raised $21.6 million in venture capital and expanded to nine locations.

Family life
Nelson has four daughters with her husband, Carleton Nelson – Sloane, Reese, Merritt, and Holland.

References

Further reading 
 Interview with Bloomberg
 Interview on The Today Show

1980 births
Living people
Emory University alumni
New York University School of Law alumni
Social entrepreneurs